Leslie Jones may refer to:
 Leslie Jones (conductor) (1905–1982), English lawyer and conductor
 Leslie Jones (cricketer) (1891–1962), English cricketer
 Leslie Jones (footballer) (1911–1981), Welsh footballer
 Leslie Jones (comedian) (born 1967), American comedian and actress
 Leslie Jones (film editor), American film editor
 Leslie Ronald Jones (1886–1967), American photographer
 Leslie Ann Jones, American record producer

See also
 Les Jones (disambiguation)
 Lesley-Ann Jones (born 1956), English journalist and author